Piecewise linear may refer to:
 Piecewise linear curve, a connected sequence of line segments
 Piecewise linear function, a function whose domain can be decomposed into pieces on which the function is linear
 Piecewise linear manifold, a topological space formed by gluing together flat spaces
 Piecewise linear homeomorphism, a topological equivalence between two piecewise linear manifolds
 Piecewise linear cobordism, a cohomology theory
 Piecewise linear continuation, a method for approximating functions by piecewise linear functions